Basic American Foods is an American food corporation.

Overview
It was started in 1933 by Jaquelin H. Hume and his brother Bill Hume as a dehydration processing plant in Vacaville, California. In the 1950s, they established a potato processing plant in Blackfoot, Idaho, whereby potato powder could be turned into mashed potatoes by adding boiling water. This technique was used by brands such as Potato Pearls, Golden Grill, Classic Casserole and Savory Series. In 1986, they invented the same technique for beans, for brands such as Santiago Refried Beans and later Santiago Black Beans and Santiago Quick-Start Chili. The company holds forty patents for food production.

The company is led by Jaquelin's sons, William J. Hume and George H. Hume. It is headquartered in Walnut Creek, California.

References

External links

Food and drink companies established in 1933
Companies based in Contra Costa County, California
Food and drink in the San Francisco Bay Area
Food and drink companies based in California
1933 establishments in California